EnStream LP is a mobile commerce joint venture company owned by Bell Mobility, Rogers and TELUS—Canada’s three main wireless companies. The three carriers formed EnStream LP in 2005.  EnStream provides digital identity verification and authentication services for 3rd party applications, enhancing user convenience and reducing identity theft and fraud. EnStream formerly managed a mobile money transfer service called Zoompass.

Uses of EnStream API's  
 Contact Number Verification
 Fraud Detection
 Instant Account Opening
 Anti Money Laundering Compliance
 Geo-restricted Service Verification
Transport and Logistics Services

Awards 

|-
| 2010
| Enstream LP - Zoompass 
| Canadian Innovation Award for Mobile Application 
| 
|-
| 2011
| Enstream LP - Zoompass Mobile Wallet & Prepaid MasterCard Program
| Best Consumer Value in Prepaid  - Paybefore Awards
| 
|-

EnStream divested Zoompass in 2012.

Notes

External links
 EnStream LP

Mobile payments